Lotta Olsson (born 1960) is a Swedish politician. She serves as Member of the Riksdag representing the constituency of Örebro County.

References 

Living people
1960 births
Place of birth missing (living people)
21st-century Swedish politicians
21st-century Swedish women politicians
Members of the Riksdag 2010–2014
Members of the Riksdag 2014–2018
Members of the Riksdag 2018–2022
Members of the Riksdag from the Moderate Party
Women members of the Riksdag